Charles Freeman Libby (January 31, 1844 – June 3, 1915) was an American politician and lawyer from Maine. Libby, a Republican served as President of the Maine Senate from 1891 to 1892 and later as President of the American Bar Association.

Biography
Libby was born in Limerick, Maine, and his family moved to Portland a few years later. Libby graduated from Portland High School and Bowdoin College in 1864. He interned with a local law firm and studied at Columbia Law School and was admitted to the bar in 1866. In 1882, he served as Mayor of Portland, Maine and was elected to the Maine Senate in 1889, serving until 1892.

He married Alice W. Bradbury on December 9, 1869, and they had two children.

Libby died at his home in Portland on June 3, 1915.

References

1844 births
1915 deaths
People from Limerick, Maine
Politicians from Portland, Maine
Maine lawyers
Bowdoin College alumni
Columbia Law School alumni
Presidents of the American Bar Association
Presidents of the Maine Senate
Republican Party Maine state senators
19th-century American politicians
Portland High School (Maine) alumni
19th-century American lawyers